CM Draconis (GJ 630.1A) is an eclipsing binary system approximately 47 light-years away in the constellation of Draco (the Dragon).  The system consists of two nearly identical red dwarf stars located in the constellation Draco. The two stars orbit each other with a period of 1.27 days with a separation of 2.7 million kilometres (0.018 AU). Along with two stars in the triple system KOI 126, the stars in CM Draconis are the lightest stars with precisely measured masses and radii. Consequently, the system plays an important role in testing stellar structure models for very low mass stars. These comparisons find that models underpredict the stellar radii by approximately 5%. This is attributed to consequences of the stars' strong magnetic activity.

According to the system's entry in the Combined General Catalogue of Variable Stars, at least one of the components is a flare star and at least one is a BY Draconis variable. The white dwarf star GJ 630.1B, located 25.7 arcseconds away shares the same proper motion as the CM Draconis stars and is thus a true companion star of the system. Given the system's distance of 47 light years, this corresponds to a separation of at least 370 astronomical units between CM Draconis and GJ 630.1B.

Possible planetary system 

The system was the subject of a dedicated search for transiting extrasolar planets in orbit around the binary from 1994–1999. In the end, the existence of all of the transiting planet candidates suggested by the project was ruled out.

Based on variations in the timing of the system's eclipses, it has been suggested that there may be an object in a circumbinary orbit around the two red dwarf stars. In 2000, it was proposed that a Jovian planet is orbiting the system with a period of 750–1050 days. A later analysis of timing variations did not confirm this proposed planet and instead suggested that there was a Jovian planet in an 18.5-year orbit, or a more massive object further out. This analysis was itself not supported by a 2009 study that found the eclipse timings were indistinguishable from linear, though the binary stars do have a small eccentricity that may indicate that they are being perturbed by an orbiting body that prevents the orbit from being fully circularised by tidal effects. A massive planet or brown dwarf on an orbit of 50–200 days would fulfil the observational criteria: the requirement for dynamical stability, the constraints from the lack of observed timing variations and the requirement that the object can maintain the eccentricity of the binary stars.

References

External links 

 

BY Draconis variables
Draco (constellation)
M-type main-sequence stars
Flare stars
Hypothetical planetary systems
0630
Draconis, CM
Eclipsing binaries